The Brück aerial testing facility  is a facility for testing aerials at Brück, south of Berlin. It was established in 1939.

Overview
On the Brück aerial testing facility there are two  wood-framework towers built in 1963, made without any metallic parts and used for mounting aerials to measure their characteristics. One of these towers, the Messturm III, consists of two towers connected by a bridge on top, while the other, the Messturm II, is from conventional design.

A third wood tower, the former Messturm I, which was built in 1958, was destroyed in a fire in 1979.

See also
List of towers

References

External links

 
 
 
 http://www.skyscraperpage.com/diagrams/?b41640
 http://www.skyscraperpage.com/diagrams/?b41641
 Satellite photograph Messturm II
 Satellite photograph Messturm III

Buildings and structures completed in 1963
Towers in Germany
Buildings and structures in Potsdam-Mittelmark
Wooden towers